Kalateh Bali (also Romanized as Kalāteh Bālī; also known as Kalāteh Bālā) is a village in Sivkanlu Rural District, in the Central District of Shirvan County, North Khorasan Province, Iran. At the 2006 census, its population was 37, in 9 families.

References 

Populated places in Shirvan County